The Eaton House Group of Schools is a group of private schools, all situated in London. It is composed of the Eaton House the Manor Nursery, Eaton House the Manor Pre-Preparatory, Eaton House the Manor Preparatory, Eaton House the Manor Girls' School, Eaton House Belgravia Pre-Preparatory, and Eaton House Belgravia Preparatory. The group became a limited liability company, with Sovereign Capital becoming the majority shareholder, when principal Hilary Harper retired and sold the company in 2016. The schools are non-selective at ages 3 and 4. In June 2021, Eaton House Schools became part of the Dukes Education family.

The schools have a non-denominational Christian ethos, and a carol service at the local church is a regular occurrence every year. Places are allocated on a first-come first-served basis, sometimes with regard to those with previous family connections with the school. In one reported case in 2017, 160 students applied for around 30 places at the Manor at age 4.). The group is a member of the Independent Association of Prep Schools.

Eaton House Belgravia Pre-Prep and Prep 

Thomas Sale Morton was born in 1867 and died on 21 January 1962, aged 95. Educated at Charterhouse School and Clare College, Cambridge, Morton was a private tutor and author of books on the classics (many of his works were used in schools as textbooks), and had previously taught at Summer Fields School. In 1897, Morton was encouraged to open a preparatory school by Helen (Nellie) Artie Tarleton Belles, the mother of Harold Macmillan, whom he was tutoring at the time.

The school was originally opened at 35 Cliveden Place, but it was moved many times in the Belgravia area, and in 1937 the current premises at Eaton Gate were purchased, and the school was renamed Eaton House School. During World War II, the pupils were evacuated to Haines Hill in Berkshire, where they boarded until the end of the war. Morton, a member of the Classical Association, abandoned the school soon after it was renamed, and moved to teach at The Hall School, Hampstead later in his career.

Following the departure of Morton, the school was then run by Robin T. Gladstone, identified to the pupils as a relative of William Ewart Gladstone. Gladstone then left the school to set up another school in East Grinstead. Due to Gladstone's ownership, the school was commonly known to students and parents as 'Mr Gladstone's day school'. In 1977, the school was renamed Eaton House Belgravia.

In 1998, Lucy Watts became headmistress of the school, retiring in July 2015. She was replaced by Annabel Abbott. In September 2017, Huw May became Headmaster of Eaton House Belgravia Pre-Prep School in Eaton Gate.  It was announced in 2018 that the school would expand on the same site to take boys from 8-11 over the next three years.

In October 2013, a media controversy was triggered over the banning of nut consumption at breakfast for pupils at home, in addition to bans on consumption of certain foods in the school; however, no complaints appear to have been made to the school over the policy.

Eaton House Pre-Preparatory has taken part in Belgravia Christmas Sunday, and regularly takes part in the wreath-laying ceremony during the Annual Service of Remembrance at the Cenotaph on Armistice Day.

Eaton House The Manor Pre-Prep and Prep

History 

The Harper family purchased the Grade II listed Byrom House at 58 Clapham Common Northside to convert it into a school consisting of a nursery, pre-preparatory school, and preparatory school. These opened in September 1993, and this building acts as a management base for the group. A girls' school has since been added.

Byrom House (built c. 1792 by John Farrer) was formerly owned by London South Bank University and Battersea College of Domestic Science, before that the Manor House School (see below) stood on the site. Before it became a school, the building was sold by Farrer in 1841, and became The Beeches. In 1905–06, a large extension was added to the right of the building.

Manor House School 
The Manor House School was founded by F.C. Maxwell in 1876. In 1898, Stanley Maxwell, his son and an old boy of the school, took over as headmaster of the school, before deciding to close it permanently in 1938. Stanley Maxwell was an accomplished teacher, and served as chairman of the Private Schools Association from 1909 to 1939, as well as on the Government Departmental Committee on Private Schools in 1930. Stanley Maxwell also became secretary of the College of Preceptors, holding this position until his death on 20 September 1944. He was also an amateur astronomer, and was elected a fellow of the Royal Astronomical Society on 11 February 1910.

Entry and leavers 
Entry from the Pre-Prep into the Prep is now decided using a system of 'continuous assessment' in year 2, instead of an exam (as was practised previously). However, those looking to enter from other schools must still take the examination.

Most boys in the Pre-Prep go on to the Prep school, with a small number leaving for other boarding or day schools, while most boys leaving the Prep go on to major public schools.

Premises 
The building contains a 'wildlife garden', opened in April 1997, construction of which was funded by the Bank of Ireland.

An extensive refurbishment programme took place from early 2003, continuing into 2017.

Heads 
In 2016, Sarah Segrave was given the role of headmistress of the Prep (having previously served as headmistress in the Girls' School, and before that the Pre-Prep) due to the retirement of Jeremy Edwards (previously master of Westminster Under School), who in turn succeeded Sebastian Hepher.

Philanthropy 
The school has worked with charities over the years, and the school is twinned with Adabase Primary School in Ghana, providing the school with funds and equipment in the past.

Eaton House The Manor Girls' School 

In 2008 refurbishment took place at the Manor, and a girls' school was built on the site in a new building on the compound, containing an underground gymnasium. Oliver Snowball is the headmaster.

Eaton House The Manor Nursery 
Roosha Sue has served as headmistress of the Nursery since 2004, teaching in the Manor Pre-Prep before taking up this post.

Notable alumni 
 Harold Macmillan, 1st Earl of Stockton, Prime Minister of the United Kingdom from 1957 to 1963, also serving in various ministries before that and as a regular MP afterwards, and World War I veteran, was educated at Eaton Gate Preparatory School, which later became Eaton House Belgravia.
 Tony Benn, veteran Labour politician, serving as an MP and cabinet minister, Postmaster General, Chairman of the Labour Party, leadership challenger, president of Stop the War Coalition, and World War II veteran, was educated at Eaton Gate Preparatory School, which later became Eaton House Belgravia.
 Richard Norton, 8th Baron Grantley, a Conservative hereditary peer, councillor and candidate in 1983 (later switching his party allegiance and becoming the first UKIP peer in the House of Lords), was educated at Eaton House.
 Julian Amery, a Conservative MP, minister, patron of the Monday Club, life peer, journalist, World War II veteran, and son-in-law of Harold Macmillan, attended Eaton House.
 Adam Nicolson, author, attended Eaton House.
 Ronald Knox, priest, theologian, and author of detective stories, was educated at Eaton Gate Preparatory School, which later became Eaton House Belgravia.
 Archibald Wavell, 1st Earl Wavell, Field Marshall in the British Army, serving in World War I, the Second Boer War, and World War II, was educated at Eaton Gate Preparatory School, which later became Eaton House Belgravia.
 Anthony Asquith, film director and son of former Prime Minister of the United Kingdom H.H. Asquith, was educated at Eaton Gate Preparatory School, which later became Eaton House Belgravia. Asquith was also privately tutored by Morton at 10 Downing Street while his father was Prime Minister.
 Philip Pullman, author, attended Eaton House Belgravia.
 Christopher Hall, television producer, attended Eaton House Belgravia.
 Laurence Olivier, actor and president of the National Theatre, was educated at Eaton Gate Preparatory School, which later became Eaton House Belgravia.
 Bear Grylls, adventurer and TV presenter, attended Eaton House.
 Eddie Redmayne, actor and Oscar winner, attended Eaton House.
 Christopher O'Neill, financier and Swedish royal, attended Eaton House.
 Sheperd Paine, American historian and miniature modeller, attended Eaton House.
An official alumni society used to exist from at least 2007 to 2009 for old boys and girls of all ages; however, there is no mention of it on their current website or literature, and reasoning suggests that it may have been discontinued.

Notable staff 
 George Mills, author of children's books, taught at Eaton Gate Preparatory School, which later became Eaton House Belgravia, from 1926 to 1938.
 Alastair Humphreys, adventurer and motivational speaker, worked as an SEN assistant at Eaton House The Manor Prep in the late 2000s.

Notes

References

External links
 School website
 View Towards Eaton Gate (Eaton House School) - Francis Frith

1897 establishments in England
Educational institutions established in 1897
Education companies of the United Kingdom
Private boys' schools in London
Private co-educational schools in London
Private girls' schools in London
Private schools in London
Private schools in the City of Westminster
Private schools in the Royal Borough of Kensington and Chelsea
Private schools in the London Borough of Wandsworth